Olatia, is the fifth studio album, released in 2007, by the Oceanic group, Te Vaka. It won the Best Pacific Album category in the New Zealand Music Awards Olatia has more of a  contemporary feeling to it while still blending in traditional Polynesian music Te Vaka are known for, with many of the songs focusing on spiritual, social, or environmental issues.

Track listing

All tracks written by Opetatia Foa'i unless otherwise noted.

References

2007 albums
Te Vaka albums